United Nations Security Council resolution 1090, adopted without a vote at a closed meeting on 13 December 1996, having considered the question of the recommendation for the appointment of the Secretary-General of the United Nations, the Council recommended to the General Assembly that Mr. Kofi Annan be appointed for a term of office from 1 January 1997, to 31 December 2001.

Kofi Annan, a Ghanaian diplomat, was the seventh Secretary-General of the United Nations. The United States had vetoed another term for his predecessor, Boutros Boutros-Ghali, due to lack of reform.

It was the first time that a Security Council resolution had been adopted by acclamation.

See also
 List of United Nations Security Council Resolutions 1001 to 1100 (1995–1997)

References

External links
 
Text of the Resolution at undocs.org

 1090
 1090
December 1996 events